Rhiannon Beth "Razza" Roberts (born 30 August 1990) is a Welsh footballer who plays as a defender for Liverpool in the Women's Super League and the Wales national team.

Club career
Roberts broke into the Blackburn Rovers Ladies first team towards the end of the 2008–09 season. Her first Blackburn goal came in April 2009, against Birmingham City Ladies in the FA Women's Premier League. She left Blackburn for a 15-month contract with Doncaster Rovers Belles in July 2013.

International career
Roberts has represented England Colleges, playing in the side's first ever fixture, against Australia schools in February 2008. In June 2010 she was called up by coach Brent Hills to the England Under–23 team for a mini tournament at the University of Warwick. The following year Roberts represented Great Britain at the 2011 Universiade in Shenzhen, China. Despite Roberts' opening goal, Britain were eliminated after a 3–2 defeat by the hosts at Bao'an Stadium.

In August 2015 Roberts' good form with Doncaster Rovers Belles won her a call-up to a training camp with Jayne Ludlow's senior Wales squad. She was selected for Wales' next UEFA Women's Euro 2017 qualifying match in Austria and started the 3–0 defeat in Sankt Pölten.

Statistics
to October 2009

International goals

References

External links

 Profile at Doncaster Rovers Belles

Living people
1990 births
Blackburn Rovers L.F.C. players
Doncaster Rovers Belles L.F.C. players
Liverpool F.C. Women players
Sportspeople from Chester
FA Women's National League players
Women's Super League players
England women's under-23 international footballers
Wales women's international footballers
English women's footballers
Welsh women's footballers
Women's association football central defenders